FC Karpaty-3 Lviv was a Ukrainian football farm-team of Karpaty Lviv from Lviv, Ukraine. Created in 1997, until 2001 it played as Karpaty-2 Lviv.

Name evolution
In 2001 due to the merger between Karpaty Lviv and FC Lviv, Karpaty preserved the place of FC Lviv in the First League and transformed the former FC Lviv into the new Karpaty-2. The other Karpaty-2 Lviv that competed in the Second League was renamed to Karpaty-3.

In 2003 Karpaty-3 Lviv was renamed into Karpaty-Halychyna Lviv, coincidentally FC Halychyna Drohobych relegated that year from the professional ranks. In 2004 Karpaty-Halychyna Lviv was taken out of competitions due to relegation of its senior squad from the Ukrainian Premier League. Since then the team was not revived.

League and cup history

{|class="wikitable"
|-bgcolor="#efefef"
! Season
! Div.
! Pos.
! Pl.
! W
! D
! L
! GS
! GA
! P
!Domestic Cup
!colspan=2|Europe
!Notes
|-
|align=center|1997–98
|align=center|3rd "A"
|align=center bgcolor=tan|3
|align=center|34
|align=center|16
|align=center|5
|align=center|13
|align=center|54
|align=center|50
|align=center|53
|align=center|1/256 finals
|align=center|
|align=center|
|align=center|as Karpaty-2
|-
|align=center|1998–99
|align=center|3rd "A"
|align=center|8
|align=center|28
|align=center|11
|align=center|6
|align=center|11
|align=center|30
|align=center|40
|align=center|39
|align=center|Did not enter
|align=center|
|align=center|
|align=center|as Karpaty-2
|-
|align=center|1999-00
|align=center|3rd "A"
|align=center|8
|align=center|30
|align=center|12
|align=center|6
|align=center|12
|align=center|43
|align=center|43
|align=center|42
|align=center|1/32 finals Second League Cup
|align=center|
|align=center|
|align=center|as Karpaty-2
|-
|align=center|2000–01
|align=center|3rd "A"
|align=center|8
|align=center|30
|align=center|13
|align=center|3
|align=center|14
|align=center|45
|align=center|35
|align=center|42
|align=center|1/16 finals Second League Cup
|align=center|
|align=center|
|align=center|as Karpaty-2
|-
|align=center|2001–02
|align=center|3rd "A"
|align=center|9
|align=center|36
|align=center|14
|align=center|11
|align=center|11
|align=center|38
|align=center|31
|align=center|53
|align=center|
|align=center|
|align=center|
|align=center|
|-
|align=center|2002–03
|align=center|3rd "A"
|align=center|10
|align=center|28
|align=center|8
|align=center|8
|align=center|12
|align=center|24
|align=center|33
|align=center|32
|align=center|
|align=center|
|align=center|
|align=center|
|-
|align=center|2003–04
|align=center|3rd "A"
|align=center|14
|align=center|30
|align=center|7
|align=center|7
|align=center|16
|align=center|22
|align=center|36
|align=center|28
|align=center|
|align=center|
|align=center|
|align=center bgcolor=pink|as Halychyna-KarpatyRelegated
|}

See also
Karpaty-2 Lviv
Karpaty Lviv
FC Karpaty Lviv Reserves and Youth Team

References

External links
ukrsoccerhistory.com – source of information

FC Karpaty Lviv
Football clubs in Lviv
Ukrainian reserve football teams
Defunct football clubs in Ukraine
Association football clubs established in 2001
Association football clubs disestablished in 2003
2001 establishments in Ukraine
2003 disestablishments in Ukraine